Adelajda Mroske (25 June 1944 – 9 January 1975) was a Polish speed skater. She competed in four events at the 1964 Winter Olympics.

References

1944 births
1975 deaths
Polish female speed skaters
Olympic speed skaters of Poland
Speed skaters at the 1964 Winter Olympics
Sportspeople from Gdynia